Vučko may refer to:

Vučko (surname)
Vučko (mascot), the Olympic mascot of the 1984 Winter Olympics
Vučko Borilović (1988–2022), perpetrator of the 2022 Cetinje shooting